Stephen Držislav was King of Croatia from AD 969 until his death around 997. He was a member of the Trpimirović dynasty. He ruled from Biograd with Godemir as his Ban.

Biography

Early period
Stephen Držislav was a son of king Michael Krešimir II and Queen Helen of Zadar. Helen acted as regent for the young king from 969 until her death on 8 October 976. During Byzantine emperor Basil II's war against Tsar Samuil of Bulgaria, Stephen Držislav allied with the Byzantines. After Basil managed to defend every single Adriatic coastal city during Samuil's rampage towards Zadar in 986, the cities were returned to Croatian control. Samuil, however, invaded central Croatia and conquered the territories of Bosnia between the Drina and Bosna rivers. Samuil pursued some of his cousins during the war and they often sought help in Croatia. King Držislav took fourteen of them, gave them hospitality and a residence near Klis. According to Martin, the Archbishop of Split, in 994 they collected money for the construction of the Orthodox St. Michael church in Solin.

In an effort to compensate and award Držislav for his alliance, the Eastern Roman Emperor named Stephen Držislav Patriarch and an Exarch of Dalmatia, which gave him formal authority over the Theme of Dalmatia. Stephen Držislav received royal insignia as an act of recognition from the Byzantine Emperor.

Držislav built on his parents' feats and secured sovereignty over the Theme of Dalmatia, lost to Byzantium under Trpimir II. The Theme of Dalmatia at that time included the towns (but not the hinterland) of Krk, Osor, Rab, Zadar, Trogir and Split. He also delegated much of his authority to his powerful governors (bans).

Rule
The 13th-century work Historia Salonitana by Thomas the Archdeacon notes that Zachlumia (or Chulmie) was a part of the Kingdom of Croatia, before and after Stephen Držislav.

In 996, Venetian Doge Pietro II Orseolo stopped paying tax for safe passage to the Croatian King after a century of peace, renewing old hostilities. Stephen Držislav, together with the Neretvians, fought the Venetian fleet, but with little success. He sent delegates demanding resumption of the tribute, but the Doge demurred and the war continued.   

Before the end of his reign, Stephen Držislav gave Svetoslav, his oldest son, the title of Duke and Svetoslav became his co-ruler. Držislav was preparing Svetoslav to be his successor. It is probable that Svetoslav ruled concurrently with his father during the 990s. Stone panels from the altar of a 10th-century church in Knin, reveal the following inscription in Latin: CLV DUX HROATOR IN TE PUS D IRZISCLV DUCE MAGNU. In English, this means: Svetoslav, Duke of the Croats at the time of Drzislav the Great Duke. The stone panels are kept at the Museum of Croatian Archaeological Monuments in Split.

Držislav's rule was one of the longest of Kings in Croatia, spanning nearly three decades. In addition to Svetoslav, he had two other sons, Krešimir, and Gojslav, and all three of them were to hold the title of King of Croatia over the following decades. Stephen Držislav died in 997, leaving his descendants to struggle for control over the Croatian Kingdom while the war with Venice continued.

Croatian checkerboard 
By legend, it is said that he was captured by the Venetians and played a chess match against Doge Pietro II Orseolo. He won all 3 matches and gained freedom, later incorporating the red checkerboard into the Croatian coat of arms.

See also
History of Croatia
List of rulers of Croatia

References

Drzislav
Trpimirović dynasty
Year of birth unknown
Drzislav
Medieval Bosnia and Herzegovina
Roman Catholic monarchs
10th-century Croatian monarchs
Burials at the Church of St. Stephen, Solin